Bear Creek is a stream in Ste. Genevieve County in the U.S. state of Missouri. It is a tributary of Terre Bleue Creek.

Bear Creek most likely was so named on account of bears near its course.

See also
List of rivers of Missouri

References

Rivers of Ste. Genevieve County, Missouri
Rivers of Missouri